Karol Dobiaš (born 18 December 1947) is a former Slovak football player and coach.  During his career, he was a versatile player, mostly playing as defender or midfielder.

Player career
He was born in Handlová.  His career started in Baník Handlová. In 1965 he moved to Spartak Trnava where he achieved the biggest success as a player. With Spartak he became a five time Czechoslovakian champion and won three national cups. In 1970 and 1971, he was named Czechoslovak Footballer of the Year. In 1977, he moved to Bohemians Prague. During his career he played 345 matches in the Czechoslovak league and scored 20 goals. In 1980, he was allowed to be transferred abroad and he went to KSC Lokeren in Belgium. He ended his career in 1984 at Racing Gand.

He was capped 67 times for Czechoslovakia, scored 6 goals. He was a participant at the 1970 FIFA World Cup and a member of Czechoslovak winning team at 1976 European Football Championship. In the 1976 final game Dobiaš scored a goal that gave Czechoslovakia a 2–0 lead against West Germany.

Coaching career 

Dobias' first team as a manager was the youth squad of Bohemians Prague. In 1988/89 he managed SK Hradec Králové but was dismissed after the 14th game day. In September 1990 he was assigned manager of Zbrojovka Brno. The team was relegated and with Dobiaš it achieved a one-season comeback. In 1993/1994 he managed Sparta Prague and won the Czech league. Still he was fired after just two games the following season. In 1995/1996 he coached a minor Prague team SK Sparta Krč. Afterwards he worked for many years as a scout for Sparta Prague. For the 2003/2004 he was selected an assistant manager for Bohemians Prague but his contract was cancelled in January 2004.

References

External links
 Profile & stats - Lokeren

1947 births
Living people
Slovak footballers
Czechoslovak footballers
Slovak football managers
Bohemians 1905 players
FC Spartak Trnava players
K.S.C. Lokeren Oost-Vlaanderen players
1970 FIFA World Cup players
UEFA Euro 1976 players
UEFA Euro 1980 players
UEFA European Championship-winning players
Czechoslovakia international footballers
FC Zbrojovka Brno managers
AC Sparta Prague managers
Czechoslovak expatriate footballers
Expatriate footballers in Belgium
Czechoslovak expatriate sportspeople in Belgium
Association football midfielders
Association football defenders
People from Handlová
Sportspeople from the Trenčín Region
K.R.C. Gent players